Ride, Rise, Roar is a documentary film chronicling the Songs of David Byrne and Brian Eno Tour conducted by David Byrne in 2008–2009. The film includes concert footage, footage of the planning and rehearsals for the tour, and exclusive interviews with Byrne, Eno, and the supporting musicians and dancers.

Production
Curtis initially proposed documenting the tour with no clear objective for the film and decided to focus on the collaboration between Byrne and his tour mates as well as the unique challenge of combining popular music with modern dance. Byrne wanted the film to display what it takes to put on a concert.

Release
The film was released to the 2010 film festival circuit, with the debut at South by Southwest on March 15, 2010, where it was screened in all three media categories—film, interactive, and music. Following this, it was displayed by the Seattle International Film Festival and Silverdocs. The film is the feature-length directorial debut by Hillman Curtis—who also worked on the short film that accompanies the deluxe edition of the Byrne–Eno album Everything That Happens Will Happen Today. Byrne attended some British screenings for question and answer sessions.

Reception
On review aggregator Rotten Tomatoes the film has an approval rating of 78% based on reviews from 9 critics. Most positive reviews were restrained: for instance, The Quietus called the film "handsome albeit conventional"; writing for The Guardian, Andrew Pulver noted that it was a "pretty straightforward concert movie" and gave the film three out of five stars, but criticized Curtis' direction for using bland shots. A negative review from The Strangers Christopher Frizzelle advised potential viewers to "run in the other direction" due to the poor choreography and dull interviews. The Independents Anthony Quinn found the choreography unacceptable as well as Byrne's arrangement and song selection. Other reviews—such as Empires Phil de Semlyen—preferred the emphasis on dance and found the choreography enjoyable. A complaint of several reviewers was the lack of uninterrupted musical performances, with interview clips cutting short the live footage.

Comparisons with the 1984 Talking Heads documentary Stop Making Sense were inevitable—The Seattle Times even dubbed this a "sequel"—and reviews universally found the former film to be stronger. For instance, View London considers Ride, Rise, Roar entertaining, but "not on the level of classica rockumentaries", whereas Stop Making Sense is "generally reckoned to be one of the best concert movies ever made." Time Out Chicagos assessment of Hillman Curtis acknowledges the "challenging position" that he was in by being compared to Jonathan Demme's direction, but sums up the review by calling the film "a very satisfying experience."

Songs

The movie includes performances of the following songs:
 "Once in a Lifetime" (David Byrne, Brian Eno, Chris Frantz, Jerry Harrison, and Tina Weymouth)
 "Life Is Long" (Byrne and Eno)
 "I Zimbra" (Byrne, Eno, and Hugo Ball)
 "Road to Nowhere" (Byrne)
 "One Fine Day" (Byrne and Eno)
 "The Great Curve" (Byrne, Eno, Frantz, Harrison, and Weymouth)
 "My Big Nurse" (Byrne and Eno)
 "Burning Down the House" (Byrne, Frantz, Harrison, and Weymouth)
 "Houses in Motion" (Byrne, Eno, Frantz, Harrison, and Weymouth)
 "Air" (Byrne)
 "Life During Wartime" (Byrne, Frantz, Harrison, and Weymouth)
 "Heaven" (Byrne and Harrison)
 "I Feel My Stuff" (Byrne and Eno)
 "Everything That Happens" (Byrne and Eno)

Personnel
 David Byrne – voice and guitar
 Mark De Gli Antoni – keyboards
 Paul Frazier – bass guitar
 Graham Hawthorne – drums
 Mauro Refosco – percussion, acoustic guitar
 Redray Frazier – background vocals, acoustic guitar
 Kaïssa – background vocals
 Jenni Muldaur – background vocals
 Lily Baldwin – dancing
 Natalie Kuhn – dancing
 Steven Reker – dancing
 Additional appearances as interviewees (not on stage)
 David Whitehead – David Byrne's manager
 Annie-B. Parson – choreography ("I Zimbra")
 Sonya Robbins and Layla Childs a.k.a. Robbinschilds Dance – choreography ("The Great Curve")
 Noémie Lafrance – choreography ("I Feel My Stuff")
 Brian Eno – co-composer

See also
 Everything That Happens Will Happen Today
 Songs of David Byrne and Brian Eno Tour
 Everything That Happens Will Happen on This Tour – David Byrne on Tour: Songs of David Byrne and Brian Eno

References

External links
 
 Film trailer
 British promotional site
 
 
 

2010 films
2010 documentary films
American documentary films
American rock music films
Black-and-white documentary films
Brian Eno
David Byrne
Documentary films about dance
Documentary films about rock music and musicians

Films set in Santa Barbara, California

Films set in Edinburgh
Films set in London
Films set in New York (state)
Films set in New York City
Films set in 2009
Films set in 2010
Films set in Virginia
Films shot in California
Films shot in London
Films shot in New York (state)
Films shot in New York City
Films shot in Scotland
Films shot in Virginia
Films directed by Hillman Curtis
American black-and-white films
2010s English-language films
2010s American films